Baier is a surname of German origin with the meaning "person from Bavaria". Notable people with the surname include: 

Annette Baier, (1929–2012), New Zealand moral philosopher, wife of Kurt
Bret Baier, reporter
Christel Baier (born 1965), German computer scientist
Daniel Baier, German footballer
Ernst Baier, figure skater 
Fred Baier, furniture designer
Johann Jacob Baier (1677–1735), German doctor and paleontologist
Johann Wilhelm Baier (1647–1697), Lutheran theologian
Kurt Baier, moral philosopher, husband of Annette
Leslie Joan Baier, American scientist
Paulo Baier, Brazilian footballer
Sherri Baier, Canadian figure skater

See also 
 Bajer (disambiguation)
 Bayer (surname)
 Beyer, a surname

German-language surnames
German toponymic surnames
Ethnonymic surnames